Anton Chigurh is a fictional character and the main antagonist of Cormac McCarthy's novel No Country for Old Men. In the film adaptation of the same name, he is portrayed by Javier Bardem.

Bardem's performance as Chigurh was widely lauded by film critics—he won an Academy Award, Golden Globe Award and a British Academy Film Award for the role. Other accolades include Chigurh's presence on numerous Greatest Villain lists, most notably in Empire Magazines list of The 100 Greatest Movie Characters of All Time, in which he was ranked #44, as well as being named the most realistic film depiction of a psychopath by an independent group of psychologists in the Journal of Forensic Sciences.

Character overview 
Chigurh is  devoid of conscience, remorse, and compassion. He is described by Carson Wells, a central character in the novel, as a  "psychopathic killer", in his 30s, with a dark complexion. Other characters describe Chigurh's facial features as "exotic looking". His signature weapon is a captive bolt stunner, which he uses to kill his victims and also as a tool to shoot out door locks. He also wields a sound-suppressed Remington 11-87 semiautomatic shotgun and pistol (as well as a TEC-9 in the film adaptation). Throughout both the novel and the film, Chigurh flips a coin to decide the fate of some of his victims.

Creation
The character is a recurrence of the "Unstoppable Evil" archetype frequently found in Cormac McCarthy's work, though the Coen brothers wanted to avoid one-dimensionality, particularly a comparison to The Terminator. To avoid a sense of identification, the Coens sought to cast someone "who could have come from Mars". The brothers introduced the character at the beginning of the film in a manner similar to the opening of the 1976 film The Man Who Fell to Earth. Film critic David DuBos described Chigurh as a "modern equivalent of Death from Ingmar Bergman's 1957 film The Seventh Seal."

When Joel and Ethan Coen approached Javier Bardem about playing Chigurh, he replied, "I don't drive, I speak bad English and I hate violence." The Coens responded, "That's why we called you." Bardem said he took the role because it was his dream to be in a Coen Brothers film.

The Coen brothers got the idea for Chigurh's hairstyle from a book Tommy Lee Jones had. It featured a 1979 photo of a man sitting in the bar of a brothel with a very similar hairstyle and clothes similar to those worn by Chigurh in the film. Oscar-winning hairstylist Paul LeBlanc designed the hairdo. The Coens instructed LeBlanc to create a "strange and unsettling" hairstyle. LeBlanc based the style on the mop tops of the English warriors in the Crusades as well as the Mod haircuts of the 1960s. Bardem told LeBlanc each morning when he finished that the style helped him to get into character. Bardem supposedly said that he was "not going to get laid for two months" because of his haircut.

His background and nationality are left undisclosed and largely open to speculation. The film Nail Gun Massacre, made in Texas in the 1980s and released direct to VHS, features a killer who carries around a pneumatic nailgun, tank, and air hose. When writer Cormac McCarthy visited the set of the film adaptation of his novel, the actors inquired about Chigurh's background and the symbolic significance of his name. McCarthy simply replied, "I just thought it was a cool name."

Role in the plot
In 1980, Chigurh is hired to retrieve a satchel holding $2.4 million from the scene of a drug deal gone wrong in West Texas. He discovers that a local welder named Llewelyn Moss, who chanced upon the money while hunting, has taken it and left town. Chigurh tracks Moss down to a motel using a receiver that connects to a transponder hidden in the satchel. However, Moss has hidden the money in a ventilation duct, and when he returns to the motel, suspecting (correctly) that someone is in his room, he retrieves the money from the connected vent in a second rented room on the other side of the motel. His original room is occupied by a group of Mexican gangsters sent to ambush him. When Chigurh enters this room, he kills the gangsters and searches for the money, but it is nowhere to be found. Moss, meanwhile, has already fled after hearing the gunfire.

Chigurh ruthlessly tracks Moss down. The hotel confrontation between Moss and Chigurh plays out very differently in the film than in the novel. In the novel, Chigurh steals the key from a murdered hotel clerk and quietly enters Moss's room, where Moss ambushes him and takes him captive at gunpoint. Then Moss runs and the chase/shootout begins. As Chigurh and Moss face off in the hotel and the streets, they are interrupted by a group of Mexicans, all of whom Chigurh kills. In the film, Chigurh punches out the lock on the hotel door and wounds Moss. During their ensuing face off, only Moss and Chigurh are shown fighting; the group of Mexicans is not present.

Chigurh finds out that Carson Wells, another bounty hunter and a former colleague, has been hired to retrieve the money and eliminate him. Chigurh kills Wells, who tried to make a deal with Moss to give him protection in exchange for the money. Chigurh then intercepts a phone call from Moss in Wells' hotel room and offers to spare Moss's wife if he agrees to give up the money. Moss refuses and vows to track down and kill Chigurh. Chigurh kills the man who hired him and the Mexicans as an act of revenge for not trusting Chigurh to complete the job. Moss is eventually killed by Mexican hitmen while in a motel in El Paso. Unknown by the Mexicans at the time of their ambush, however, Moss had hidden the money in the vents again. Chigurh shows up after the police have left, retrieves the money from the vent, and gives it back to the investor.

Moss's widow returns home after her mother's funeral to find Chigurh inside waiting for her. After hearing her pleas for mercy, he asks her to bet her life on a coin toss. In the book, she calls heads; it comes up tails, and he shoots and kills her. In the film adaptation, she refuses to call the toss, saying, "the coin don't have no say. It's just you." The movie then cuts to a shot of Chigurh leaving the house and checking the soles of his boots for blood, implying that he has killed her. While driving away from her house, Chigurh is badly injured in a car accident, sustaining a compound fracture of his left ulna and walking away with a limp. At the scene of the accident, before the authorities arrive, he offers $100 to a teenager on a bicycle to give him his shirt, seeking to use it to bind up his wounds and use it as a sling for his now broken arm. Chigurh then flees the scene before the ambulance arrives.

Personality
Chigurh is a violent psychopath who kills without compassion or remorse but always with deliberation. He is described as having his own twisted set of morals. While he does not kill without purpose, his reasons are at times abstract and typically selfish (e.g., murdering someone for the sole intention of taking his or her vehicle). He sees himself as a hand of fate; an instrument who exacts what is supposed to happen upon those he sees accountable. He gives many of his victims a chance to survive by making deals, either personally or by flipping coins in making decisions. He is incredibly unsettled when one of his victims points out that the coin has no say in his killings, suggesting his means of avoiding responsibility and hiding pleasure in murder are a facade. He is depicted as having a great deal of pain endurance, such as being capable of withstanding pain from multiple shotgun blasts or from a fractured arm.

Chigurh kills or tries to kill almost every person he meets in the film. The only people he spares are the gas station proprietor (who correctly guesses Chigurh's coin flip), the woman at the trailer park office (when Chigurh hears a toilet flush in a nearby room), the woman at the motel front desk, and the two bicycle riding kids who give Chigurh one of their shirts after his accident.

Analysis
Chigurh's depiction as a seemingly inhuman foreign antagonist is said to reflect the apprehension of the post-9/11 era. Many of McCarthy's works portray individuals in conflict with society, acting on instinct rather than emotion or thought.

Reception
Critics have praised Bardem's portrayal of Chigurh, for which he received an Academy Award, a Golden Globe and a BAFTA.

Yale professor Harold Bloom labelled Chigurh the main weakness of No Country for Old Men, saying "has none of the legitimacy or grandeur that Judge Holden has."

UGO.com ranked him in its list of top 11 "silver screen psychos", saying, "Chigurh is an assassin of little words and interesting choices of weaponry—is a man without a sense of humor. Others might say he's got a warped sense of principles. One thing that most can agree on, is Chigurh is one crazy S.O.B.—ruthlessly killing damn near anyone who sets eyes on him, let alone those who get in his way. And apparently, the only way you can survive a run-in with the man is the 50–50 chance of a coin toss, but Dear God, don't question his motives, it just seems to irritate him even more so."

Empire.com ranked him #46 in their list of the 100 Greatest Movie Characters of All Time, praising the look on his face when he strangles a cop with his own handcuffs and that "when American novelist Cormac McCarthy wants to throw a dark character at you, it's a safe assumption that you're not going to be able to get them out of your head for a good, long while—if ever. One of his best is Chigurh, and between the Coens and Bardem, they never missed a beat in bringing this monster to the screen. With the kind of unholy relentlessness usually reserved for horror icons, the hired killer has an almost supernatural ability to track his prey, and is rather short in the mercy department, preferring to leave the tough decisions to a coin toss. And that bowl cut is utterly terrifying."

In popular culture
Being well received after the theatrical run of No Country for Old Men, Chigurh has been parodied in other media, mainly as a spoof of the film's most memorable scenes. Ike Barinholtz plays Anton Chigurh in the spoof movie Disaster Movie, while Carlos Areces plays Anton Chigurh in the spoof movie Spanish Movie. The British comedy series Benidorm also parodied the character in the 2009 special.

The Simpsons episode "Waverly Hills, 9-0-2-1-D'oh" spoofed Chigurh as a city inspector for Waverly Hills, while the episode "Daddicus Finch" showed character Nelson Muntz portraying a Chigurh-like character during a school performance.

A parody titled There Will Be Milkshakes for Old Men was featured in Episode 5 of Season 33 of NBC’s Saturday Night Live, which aired on February 23, 2008. Fred Armisen makes an appearance as Anton Chigurh, complete with captive bolt pistol and pageboy haircut, mimicking his famous gas stop scene. The same Saturday Night Live episode also featured a parody of No Country for Old Men titled Grandkids in the Movies. Professional wrestler Chris Jericho has stated the heel version of his character debuted in 2008 was directly inspired by Anton Chigurh's calm, indomitable demeanor.
Season 4 Episode 6 of the cop parody Angie Tribeca parodies both Fargo and also has an ominous hitmen resembling Chigurh, who is looking for a stolen truck and hauls a soda gun, complete with giant metal tank, around. He kills his victims by asking them to open their mouths and then drowning them in soda water. 

In the animated series Bob's Burgers, Louise dresses up as Chigurh for Halloween in the episode "The Wolf of Wharf Street".

Kevin James spoofed Chigurh in the short film No Country for Sound Guy, released July 17, 2020.

References

Further reading

Characters in American novels of the 21st century
Coin flipping
Cormac McCarthy characters
Thriller film characters
Fictional contract killers
Fictional gangsters
Fictional gunfighters
Literary characters introduced in 2005
Fictional mass murderers
Fictional outlaws
Fictional prison escapees
Fictional nihilists
Male characters in literature
Male characters in film
Male literary villains
Male film villains
Action film villains